The Mistress is a 1962 Swedish drama film directed by Vilgot Sjöman. It marked Sjöman's directoral debut and was entered into the 13th Berlin International Film Festival where Bibi Andersson won the Silver Bear for Best Actress award. The film was also selected as the Swedish entry for the Best Foreign Language Film at the 35th Academy Awards, but was not accepted as a nominee.

Cast
 Bibi Andersson - The Girl
 Birger Lensander - Conductor
 Per Myrberg - The Boy
 Gunnar Olsson - Old Man
 Birgitta Valberg - Motherly Woman
 Max von Sydow - Married Man
 Öllegård Wellton - Married Woman

See also
 List of submissions to the 35th Academy Awards for Best Foreign Language Film
 List of Swedish submissions for the Academy Award for Best Foreign Language Film

References

External links

1962 films
Swedish drama films
1960s Swedish-language films
1962 drama films
Films directed by Vilgot Sjöman
1962 directorial debut films
Films set on trains
1960s Swedish films